The Samjeondo Monument is a monument marking the submission of the Korean Joseon dynasty to the Manchu-led Qing dynasty in 1636 after the latter's invasion of the former. Its original name was Daecheong Hwangje Gongdeok Bi (大淸皇帝功德碑), which means the stele to the merits and virtues of the Emperor of the Great Qing. Initially erected at Samjeondo, near the Sambatnaru crossing point of the Han River in modern-day Seoul, it was thereafter buried and erected again several times. It is designated as the 101st historic site of South Korea.

Erection
Following the siege of Namhansanseong, King Injo of Joseon had to surrender and was forced to accept tributary status to Qing China in 1636. The following year, Hong Taiji, founding emperor of the Qing dynasty, ordered King Injo to put up a monument "in honor of the excellent virtues of the Qing Emperor". In 1639 it was erected at Samjeondo, where the ceremony of surrender had been conducted. Inscriptions were written in Manchu and Mongolian on the front side and in Hanmun on the back; they have almost identical contents. The Hanmun version was composed by Yi Gyeongseok (李景奭), and the rest seem to have been translated from it.

Samjeondo, meaning "crossing of the three fields", was located near the Sambatnaru, a major crossing point of the Han River in early Joseon times. The Sambatnaru way was the shortest route to the stronghold of Gwangju and the southern provinces. It was also the one most often used to visit the tomb of King Taejong of Joseon at the foot of Mt. Daemosan.

Timeline
Because of the strong emotional charge attached to it, this monument has been buried and then erected again several times from 1639 till nowadays.

 1895. The monument was buried down as a result of the Treaty of Shimonoseki that concluded the First Sino-Japanese War.
 1913. The monument is erected again.
 ???. The monument is buried down after 1945. During Syngman Rhee's presidency (1948–1960), orders were given to destroy the stele, but the Ministry of Culture had it buried instead.
 1957. South Korean Government appoints the site as Historic Site No 101 (1957/02/01).
1963. The monument comes again to the eyes due to a flood of the river.
 1983. Monument is placed in a park, 37.503351 N,127.107083 E, i.e. in Seokchon-dong, Songpa-gu, Seoul, South Korea

 2010. Monument is relocated 37.510407 N, 127.101635 E.

Names
in Manchu: Daicing gurun-i Enduringge Han-i gung erdemui bei
in Mongolian: Dayičing ulus-un Boγda Qaγan-u erdem bilig-i daγurisγaγsan bei
in Hanmun: Dàqīng huángdì gōngdé bēi (大淸皇帝功德碑)

which can be translated as "the stele to the merits and virtues of the Emperor of the Great Qing."

Content

Description
Both the Qing and Joseon dynasties saw the inscription as the litmus test for the latter's attitude toward the Qing emperor, so King Injo frayed his nerves to it. As a result, it greatly flattered the Qing dynasty; namely, the inscription narrates how the king of Joseon came to attach himself to the virtue of the Qing emperor from a Joseon point of view. Although one-sided, it provides a concise account of the Qing-Joseon relationship.

The inscription starts with the description of the Qing campaign against Joseon in 1636. The Qing army besieged the Namhan fortress, where King Injo took refuge. He admitted his guilt, accepted the imperial edict and surrendered at Samjeondo. Since Hong Taiji felt compassion for the Joseon king, he mercifully sent the king back to the capital and rapidly withdrew the army without doing harm to the people.

In the next paragraph, the inscription traces the history back to the Battle of Sarhū in 1619. The Joseon army, led by Gang Hong-rip, put on the appearance of supporting the Ming dynasty but surrendered to the Qing dynasty. However, all of the soldiers except the high-ranking ones were released by Nurhaci, and the inscription emphasizes the merciful act. Since Joseon still displayed disobedient behavior, Hong Taiji commenced the Later Jin invasion of Joseon in 1627. He did not overthrow the kingdom but established a Confucian "elder brother-younger brother" relationship. The inscription then goes on to describe the second campaign. When Hong Taiji proclaimed the Qing dynasty in 1636, Joseon did not accept it even though Qing China announced a war. The inscription stressed his benevolent acts during the war.

Next, the inscription explains the background of erection of the monument. It says that the king voluntarily erected the monument at Samjeondo to let the excellent virtue of the Qing emperor be known around the world.

Finally, the inscription summarizes the entire course of events in verse.

Gallery

See also
 History of Korea
 Yeongeunmun Gate
 Independence Gate
 Kowtow
 Tributary system of China

References

External links
Manchu, Mongolian and Chinese texts

Buildings and structures in Songpa District
Manchu literature
Mongolian literature
Monuments and memorials in South Korea
Joseon dynasty
Korean steles
Outdoor sculptures in South Korea
17th-century inscriptions